The Hottentot golden mole (Amblysomus hottentotus) is a species of mammal in the golden mole family, Chrysochloridae. It is found in South Africa, Eswatini, and possibly Lesotho. Its natural habitats are temperate forests, subtropical or tropical dry and moist lowland forest and dry shrubland and grassland, Mediterranean-type shrubby vegetation, savanna, temperate grassland, sandy shores, arable land, pastureland, plantations, rural gardens, and urban areas.

It has several subspecies, including the Zulu golden mole (Amblysomus hottentotus iris).

In 2013 it was discovered that Hottentot golden moles prefer mates with larger penises.

References

External links
Hottentot golden mole at Animal Diversity Web

Afrosoricida
Mammals of South Africa
Mammals of Eswatini
Mammals of Southern Africa
Least concern biota of Africa
Hottentot golden mole
Taxonomy articles created by Polbot